Erik Jørgensen may refer to:

People
 Erik Jørgensen (athlete) (1920–2005), Danish middle-distance runner
 Erik Jørgensen (gunsmith) (1848–1896), Norwegian gunsmith
 Erik B. Jørgensen, Danish author and adventurer
 Erik M. Jorgensen, American biologist
 Erik Jorgensen (forester), Danish-Canadian forester and professor, pioneer in the field of urban forestry
 Erik Jorgensen (politician), Maine state representative; see 2018 Maine House of Representatives election

Other
 Erik Jørgensen (brand), a Danish furniture company